The North–South Axis is a tram tunnel in Brussels, Belgium, which crosses the city centre from North to South between Brussels-North railway station and Albert premetro station.

The first section of this tunnel was opened on 4 October 1976 between Brussels-North and Lemonnier premetro station. It was then expanded to Albert in 1993. It is currently used by tram routes 3, 4, 51 and 82 as well as evening routes 31, 32 and 33. Only routes 3, 4 and 33 use the full tunnel. Routes 31 and 32 use it between the North and South station, route 51 between Lemonnier and Albert and route 82 between Lemonnier and Brussels-South railway station.

Circuit and stations
To the north, the North–South Axis starts in the municipality of Schaerbeek near the crossroad between / and /. The first station in the tunnel is Brussels-North, which offers a connection with the railway station of the same name. The tunnel then crosses the municipality of Saint-Josse-ten-Noode up to Rogier station where it connects with the Brussels metro. It then enters the City of Brussels, and stops at De Brouckère (with again a connection with the metro), Bourse/Beurs, Anneessens and Lemonnier. At Lemonnier, a tunnel entry allows trams to enter or leave the tunnel at this point. The tunnel then crosses Saint-Gilles, stopping at Brussels-South railway station (where it connects with the train and the metro), at Porte de Hal/Hallepoort (where it connects with the metro), at Parvis de Saint-Gilles/Sint-Gillis Voorplein, and at Horta. At Brussels-South railway station, another entry allows trams to leave or enter the tunnel. The last stop is Albert, and is located at the border between the municipalities of Saint-Gilles and Forest. Two different tunnel entries are then located on / on the greater ring road and on /.

Metro line 3 
The North-South axis will become an actual metro line, Metro line 3. In phase 1, the existing tram tunnel will be transformed into a metro line. Lemonnier station will not be served by the metro. Instead there will be a new metro station, "Toots Thielemans" between Brussels-South station and Anneessens. The metro line should be operational by 2025.

In phase 2 of the project, metro line 3 will be extended from Brussels-North station to Bordet railway station. Seven new stations and a depot will be built for this purpose. Construction should be done by 2030.

See also
North–South Junction

References

Tram transport in Brussels
City of Brussels
Forest, Belgium
Saint-Gilles, Belgium
Saint-Josse-ten-Noode
Schaerbeek